Piramida is the fourth studio album from Danish indie rock group Efterklang. It was released on 22 September 2012. The album was their second  to be released on 4AD.  The album took inspiration from and is named for the abandoned Russian coal-mining settlement on the Norwegian Svalbard archipelago.

Track listing 
 "Hollow Mountain"
 "Apples"
 "Sedna"
 "Told to Be Fine"
 "The Living Layer"
 "The Ghost"
 "Black Summer"
 "Dreams Today"
 "Between the Walls"
 "Monument"

Charts

References 

2012 albums
Efterklang albums
4AD albums